Spruce Creek is a tributary of the Big Thompson River in Larimer County, Colorado.  The stream's source is near Sprague Pass in Rocky Mountain National Park. It flows east through Spruce Canyon to a confluence with the Big Thompson in Forest Canyon.

See also
 List of rivers of Colorado

References

Rivers of Colorado
Rocky Mountain National Park
Rivers of Larimer County, Colorado
Tributaries of the Platte River